Hee Oh (born 1969) is a South Korean mathematician who works in dynamical systems. She has made contributions to dynamics and its connections to number theory. She is a student of homogeneous dynamics and has worked extensively on counting and equidistribution for Apollonian circle packings, Sierpinski carpets and Schottky dances. She is currently the Abraham Robinson Professor of Mathematics at Yale University.

Career
She graduated with a bachelor's degree from Seoul National University in 1992 and obtained her Ph.D from Yale University in 1997 under the guidance of Gregory Margulis. She held several faculty positions, including ones at Princeton University, California Institute of Technology and Brown University, before joining the Department of Mathematics at Yale University as the first female tenured professor in Mathematics there.<ref>"Korean becomes Yale's 1st female math professor", The Chosun Ilbo, retrieved 2013-10-30</ref> She will serve as Vice President of the American Mathematical Society, February 1, 2021 – January 31, 2024.

Honours
Hee Oh was an invited speaker at the International Congress of Mathematicians in Hyderabad in 2010, and gave a joint invited address at the 2012 AMS-MAA Joint Mathematics Meeting. In 2012 she became an inaugural fellow of the American Mathematical Society.  Since 2010, she has served on the scientific advisory board of the American Institute of Mathematics. She is the 2015 recipient of the Ruth Lyttle Satter Prize in Mathematics. She was named MSRI Simons Professor for 2014-2015.

Selected publications
with Laurent Clozel, Emmanuel Ullmo: Hecke operators and equidistribution of Hecke points, Inventiones mathematicae, vol. 144, 2001, pp. 327–351
Uniform pointwise bounds for matrix coefficients of unitary representations and applications to Kazhdan constants, Duke Mathematical Journal, vol. 113, 2002, pp. 133–192
with Alex Eskin, Shahar Mozes: On uniform exponential growth for linear groups, Inventiones mathematicae, vol. 160, 2005, pp. 1–30
 Proceedings of International Congress of Mathematicians (2010): Dynamics on geometrically finite hyperbolic manifolds with applications to Apollonian circle packings and beyond'' 
with Alex Kontorovich: Apollonian circle packings and closed horospheres on hyperbolic 3-manifolds, Journal of the American Mathematical Society, vol. 24, 2011, pp. 603–648
with Nimish Shah: The asymptotic distribution of circles in the orbits of Kleinian groups, Inventiones mathematicae, vol. 187, 2012, pp. 1–35
with Nimish Shah: Equidistribution and counting for orbits of geometrically finite hyperbolic groups, Journal of the American Mathematical Society, vol. 26, 2013, pp. 511–562
with Amir Mohammadi: Ergodicity of unipotent flows and Kleinian groups, Journal of the American Mathematical Society, vol. 28, 2015, pp. 531–577
with Dale Winter: Uniform exponential mixing and resonance free regions for convex cocompact congruence subgroups of SL_2(Z), Journal of the American Mathematical Society, vol. 29, 2016, pp. 1069–1115
with Curt McMullen, Amir Mohammadi: Geodesic planes in hyperbolic 3-manifolds, Inventiones mathematicae, vol. 209, 2017, pp. 425-461
with Dale Winter: Prime number theorems and holonomies for hyperbolic rational maps, Inventiones mathematicae, vol. 208, 2017, pp. 401-440

References

External links
Homepage at Yale University
Video lecture at Cornell University
Article in the American Scientist by Dana Mackenzie 
Interview with Yale News

1969 births
Living people
20th-century American mathematicians
20th-century women mathematicians
21st-century American mathematicians
21st-century women mathematicians
American women mathematicians
Fellows of the American Mathematical Society
Place of birth missing (living people)
South Korean emigrants to the United States
20th-century South Korean mathematicians
South Korean women mathematicians
Yale University alumni
Yale University faculty
20th-century American women
21st-century American women
Recipients of the Ho-Am Prize in Science
Seoul National University alumni